Count John III ʻthe Youngerʼ of Nassau-Siegen (d. 18 April 1430), succeeded, with his brothers, his father in 1416 as Count of Nassau-Siegen (a part of the County of Nassau). With his brothers, he inherited the County of Vianden in 1417, and also inherited half of the County of Diez in 1420. He descended from the Ottonian Line of the House of Nassau.

Biography
John was the fifth son of Count John I of Nassau-Siegen and Countess .

John served as provost of the Münster Cathedral 1410–1414.

With his brothers, Adolf I, John II ʻwith the Helmetʼ and Engelbert I, John succeeded his father in 1416 as Count of Nassau-Siegen. They had already agreed on a joint continuation of the government on 21 December 1409. Whichever of the brothers would be native or closest to his lands on the fatherʼs death should take possession of them in all brothersʼ name until a division would have taken place. Whoever would take something for himself alone would be disinherited. All parental decrees favouring one brother over the other were declared null and void in advance. Adolf hereby tacitly renounced his right to the part of Nassau-Hadamar and the districts of Herborn, Haiger and Löhnberg, which he could have claimed in advance from the marriage contract with the heiress of the County of Diez. In accordance with this agreement, the brothers took over the government jointly after their fatherʼs death in 1416. However, the intended division did not take place: Adolf had no male offspring, the elder John was not married, the younger of the same name was a clergyman; it was to be expected that a division would not last long. Together, the brothers bought back the other half of the city of Siegen from the Electorate of Cologne.

When Elisabeth of Sponheim-Kreuznach, Countess of Vianden, died without issue in 1417, the four brothers, grandsons of Adelaide of Vianden, Elisabethʼs great-aunt, inherited the County of Vianden with the lordships of St. Vith, Bütgenbach, Dasburg and Grimbergen.

After the death of the eldest brother Adolf in 1420, the three remaining brothers succeeded him, but they lost half of the County of Diez, as well as ¼ of Camberg in 1428. The County of Nassau-Siegen was divided by the brothers; John obtained Haiger and Siegen in this division.

John obtained  with the toll at Lahnstein from Roman King Sigismund on 4 April 1418. He was appointed by Duke Adolf IV of Cleves as Oberst and Amtmann over all his lands on 21 September 1424, for a period of eight years. In 1429 or 1439, the counts of Virneburg paid the brothers 21,000 gold guilders to buy off their claims to the heerlijkheid of Ravenstein with Herpen and Uden.

John died unmarried on 18 April 1430. He was succeeded by his brothers John II and Engelbert I, who jointly ruled Nassau-Siegen, Vianden and Diez again.

Johnʼs swearing letter

John ʻthe Youngerʼ participated alongside Duke John III of Bavaria in the  against Duke John IV of Brabant and Countess Jacqueline of Holland in 1418. Because John ʻthe Youngerʼ had the luck on his side, John III of Bavariaʼs army was victorious. For this military service, John III of Bavaria owed John ʻthe Youngerʼ 5,000 guilders, which, in a debenture, he promised to pay in Arnhem on 25 July 1419. However, John III of Bavaria did not pay his debt. After a complaint to a vehmic court in Westphalia was unsuccessful, John ʻthe Youngerʼ resorted to a swearing letter which he sent to several noble courts. This swearing letter disgraced John III of Bavaria as a word-breaker and non-payer of his debts. The letter includes a drawing that closely resembles a present cartoon in which John III of Bavaria is depicted holding up a pig by its curly tail and pressing his seal stamp on the pigʼs buttocks with the other hand. The accompanying text reads:“Ich, der Graf von Hennegau und Holland,stehe hier vor dem Hintern dieser Sauund drücke hier mein Siegel an,weil ich es verpfändet und nicht eingelöst habevon dem Junggrafen Johann von Nassau.In Briefen ist es doch nicht mehr zu Danke,so wenig wie mein Eidschwur und meine Ehre.Ein Thor, der mir noch ferner dient.”(English translation: “I, the Count of Hainault and Holland, stand here before the ass of this swine and do here affix my seal, because I have pledged it and not redeemed it, to Count John of Nassau. In letters it is no more to thank, as little as my oath and my honour. A fool who serves me furthermore.”As proof of the debt, the letter also contained a copy of the original debenture from John III of Bavaria to John ʻthe Youngerʼ. The swearing letter is 80 cm long and 42 cm wide and is kept in the Hessian Central State Archives in Wiesbaden.

Illegitimate child
John had a illegitimate daughter:
 Elisabeth von Nassau, was a nun in Cologne in 1501.

Ancestors

Notes

References

Sources
 
 
 
 
 
  (1882). Het vorstenhuis Oranje-Nassau. Van de vroegste tijden tot heden (in Dutch). Leiden: A.W. Sijthoff/Utrecht: J.L. Beijers.

External links
 Image and description of John IIIʼs swearing letter.
 Nassau. In: Medieval Lands. A prosopography of medieval European noble and royal families, by Charles Cawley.
 Nassau Part 4. In: An Online Gotha, by Paul Theroff.

|-

Nassau-Siegen, John 03
Counts of Diez
Counts of Nassau
Counts of Vianden
House of Nassau-Siegen
14th-century German nobility
15th-century German nobility
Year of birth unknown